Romelio Salas (born 5 May 1958) is a Colombian wrestler. He competed at the 1984 Summer Olympics and the 1992 Summer Olympics.

References

External links
 

1958 births
Living people
Colombian male sport wrestlers
Olympic wrestlers of Colombia
Wrestlers at the 1984 Summer Olympics
Wrestlers at the 1992 Summer Olympics
Place of birth missing (living people)
20th-century Colombian people